Luxembourgish Brazilians refers to Brazilian citizens of full, partial, or predominantly Luxembourgish ancestry, or Luxembourg-born immigrants in Brazil.

Luxembourgish immigration to Brazil occurred mainly around 1828, when nearly 1,000 Luxembourgers settled there. Many were in Curitiba.

See also

 Immigration to Brazil
 White Brazilians
 Luxembourgish Americans
 Luxembourgers
 Vanderlei Luxemburgo – unrelated to the country Luxembourg

References

European Brazilian
Belgian diaspora
Luxembourgian diaspora